Longmont Potion Castle (born 1972) is a musician and experimental prankster who has been active in Colorado, Los Angeles, and Seattle since 1986. Details about his personal life are scarce, and his real name is unknown to the public. Over the years, his mostly self-released albums have gained a cult following, notably among musicians.

Biography

Longmont Potion Castle has maintained his anonymity over his whole career, though his real name is known to some who have interviewed him. On some of his recordings he has been recognized though not by real identity. His birth is given in July 1972 and he has been described as tall with shoulder length hair which appear as both dark and blonde in the few photographs of him taken from behind. He is of European descent.

Longmont Potion Castle started recording "experimental, collage, prank call albums" while he was attending Columbine High School. The LA Record describes Longmont Potion Castle's albums as unlike those that most people associate with prank telephone calls, citing that his demeanor is nothing at all like that of The Jerky Boys and Crank Yankers and is actually closer to that of the alternative comedian Neil Hamburger. In a review from Denver's Westword, LPC's recordings are described as advancing "absurdity as an art form." Actor Rainn Wilson, a fan of LPC, has compared his work to "The Marx Brothers at their greatest. There's a surreal aspect, as if Salvador Dalí were doing prank phone calls."

The anonymous artist has himself described the albums he has made as "phone work" or "absurdist" art rather than the less sophisticated label of "prank phone calls", and has also said, "They may be dumb, but they're not stupid".  Those on the receiving end of a Longmont Potion Castle call are often left confused or extremely angry, as the calls frequently involve complaints about noise, requests for money or offers to "whoop" somebody. However, his calls are rarely very mean-spirited in nature. His recordings combine prank calls with sound collages and his own musical compositions, the majority of which are thrash metal instrumentals. Occasionally, Longmont Potion Castle filters his voice through a Digitech RDS 8000 rack-mounted digital delay unit to produce odd sound effects, thus making whomever he has called even more confused.

In 2006, Longmont Potion Castle announced his retirement. In an interview with The Nerve Magazine, he explained that the box set Longbox Option Package would be the final LPC release.  However, in 2008 he released a new CD, Longmont Potion Castle Volume 6. In 2009, he released Volume 7 (not to be confused with his 2005 album of the same name released as a part of the Longbox Option Package box set, a disc that contained only thrash metal music). The album featured several celebrity calls, including ones to singer Eddie Money, Jeopardy! host Alex Trebek, and guitarist Rick Derringer. January 2011 saw the release of LPC 8, in which the artist primarily used Skype on a laptop computer to record the calls, which he has utilized since.

In 2016, a crowdfunded documentary on Longmont Potion Castle entitled Where in the Hell is the Lavender House? was announced. It was released to select screenings and film festivals in 2019, and received a wider release in 2020.

Longmont Potion Castle had a brief cameo in the 2018 psychological thriller film Cam as a phone operator.

Discography

Albums
Subliminal Propaganda (also known as Longmont Potion Castle) (1986)
Longmont Potion Castle II (1992)
Longmont Potion Castle III (1995)
Longmont Potion Castle Volume 4 (2001)
Late-Eighties-Vein (2003)
Longmont Potion Castle 5 (2005)
Longmont Potion Castle Volume 6 (2008)
Longmont Potion Castle 7 (2009)
Longmont Potion Castle 8 (2011)
Longmont Potion Castle 9 (2012)
Longmont Potion Castle 10 (2013)
Longmont Potion Castle 11 (2014)
Longmont Potion Castle 12 (2015)
Longmont Potion Castle 13 (2017)
Longmont Potion Castle 14 (2017)
Longmont Potion Castle 15 (2018)
Where in the Hell is the Lavender House? Soundtrack (2018)
Longmont Potion Castle 16 (2019)
Tour Line Live (2019)
Longmont Potion Castle 17 (2020)
Longmont Potion Castle 18 (2021)
Longmont Potion Castle 19 (2022)
Longmont Potion Castle 20 (2023)

Compilations
Best of Longmont Potion Castle – Volume 1 (1996)
Best of Longmont Potion Castle – Volume 2 (1997)
Longbox Option Package (2006) Includes volumes 1–5, Late Eighties Vein, Bonus Disc and Bonus DVD
Longmont Potion Castle Tributes (2010)
Ultimate Session Bundle (2014) Included virtually every track and video ever produced on a USB thumb drive, included a T-shirt with every album cover as well as a vinyl record. Limited to 50 units total. All 50 sold on first day of availability.
Official Compact Discography (2016) Included virtually every track and video ever produced in a collector's box, on 24 CDs and 2 DVDs, included a T-shirt, as well as a detailed booklet. Limited to 25 units total. All 25 sold on first day of availability.

Collaborative releases
Longmont Potion Castle/Hatebeak split 7-inch (2004)
The Albert Lerner Trio/Longmont Potion Castle split double LP (2016)

Videos
Live from Longmont Potion Castle VHS (1998)

References

External links
D.U. Records – Record label of Longmont Potion Castle

Living people
People from Denver
Prank calling
Place of birth missing (living people)
Year of birth uncertain
1972 births
American male comedians
21st-century American comedians
Unidentified people
Comedians from Colorado
20th-century American comedians
20th-century American male musicians
21st-century American male musicians